Saar Wilf is an Israeli innovator, businessman, angel investor and poker player who provides capital for start-up businesses.

Career
Wilf did not go to college. He served in the Israeli Defense Forces' intelligence Unit 8200. He initially worked as developer and programmer.

Wilf's first start-up, in 1997, was Trivnet.com, a payments company, which was sold to Gemalto in 2010. His second start-up was Fraud Sciences Ltd, which was acquired by eBay through PayPal in 2008 for $169 million, where he worked until 2010. he As of 2014, Wilf was the chairman of Wikiwand, a mobile app and web browser extension for Wikipedia. 

By 2017, he invested in about 15 companies. His companies have included ClarityRay (acquired by Yahoo), Pointgrab, Deep Optics. and CallApp. 

His company Bzigo, founded in 2016, has developed a machine which scans a room for mosquitos and tells mobile phones where they are, describing itself as "an Iron Dome for mosquitos". In 2020, its machines were scheduled for delivery to customers in 2021, with customers encouraged to sign up by being offered large discounts for paying in advance of the technology being developed.

In 2017, Wilf founded Rootclaim, which uses probabilistic analysis to predict the likely solution to questions about controversial events such as chemical weapons attacks. For example, it attributes the 2013 Ghouta chemical attack in Syria to rebels and the downing of Malaysia Airlines Flight 17 to an accident. 

In 2018, he founded payments system Quahl (originally known as Initiative Q), backed by American economist Lawrence H. White and branded a "pyramid scheme with grandiose ideas" by the Financial Times due to the way it harvests users' personal data and promises thousands of dollars in value to those who sign up and invite five other people. Seven million users had signed up within a year.

References

Israeli poker players
Israeli businesspeople
Israeli inventors
Living people
Date of birth missing (living people)
Place of birth missing (living people)
1974 births